Gitnadoiks River Provincial Park (formerly Gitnadoix River Recreation Area) is a 58,000 hectare provincial park in British Columbia, Canada. It is centred on the Gitnadoix River, a tributary of the Skeena River in Northwestern British Columbia, 50 km west of Terrace.

Within the traditional territory of the Tsimshian people, the park is in a remote, wilderness setting in the Kitimat Ranges of the Coast Mountains and is inaccessible by road.

References

External links
BC Parks - Gitnadoiks River Provincial Park
Great Wild Spaces - Gitnadoix River Recreation Area

Skeena Country
Provincial parks of British Columbia
Kitimat Ranges
Year of establishment missing